Sanxiasaurus (meaning "Sanxia lizard", after the Three Gorges, Chinese Sanxia, of the Yangtze River) is a genus of neornithischian dinosaur from the Middle Jurassic Xintiangou Formation in the Chongqing Municipality of China. The type and only species is S. modaoxiensis. The holotype is a partial postcranial skeleton consisting of "55 bones including two cervical vertebrae, 11 dorsal vertebrae, 4 sacral vertebrae, 18 caudal vertebrae, both humeri, radii and ulnas, partial right ilium, partial right ischium, both femora and tibiae, left fibula, 3 metatarsi and 4 phalanges." In a phylogenetic analysis, it was found to be a basal neornithischian, more derived than Lesothosaurus and less derived than Hexinlusaurus.

References 

Ornithischian genera
Middle Jurassic dinosaurs of Asia
Jurassic China
Fossils of China
Fossil taxa described in 2019